Balabodh (translation: understood by children) is a slightly modified style of the Devanagari script used to write the Marathi language and the Korku language. What sets balabodha apart from the Devanagari script used for other languages is the more frequent and regular use of both ळ /ɭ/ (retroflex lateral approximant) and र्‍ (called the eyelash reph / raphar). Additionally, Balbodh style has ऍ/ॲ and ऑ as adaptations to pronounce [æ] and [ɒ] in English-based words. Another distinctive feature is the use of Anusvara over trailing अ, denoting lengthening of the trailing vowel.

Etymology 
The word balabodha is a combination of the words ‘बाळ’ /baːɭ/ and ‘बोध’ /boːd̪ʱ/. ‘बाळ’ is a neuter noun derived from the Sanskrit word bāla "child". ‘बोध’ is a male noun and a tatsama meaning "perception".

As far as the Marathi literature is concerned, Bāḷabōdha can be assumed to be composed of "bāḷa" meaning primary and "bōdha" meaning knowledge.  So Marathi bāḷabōdha may be understood as the primary knowledge of Marathi language.  In primary knowledge, Muḷākshare (Basic Letters), consisting of 12 vowels अ आ इ ई उ ऊ ए ऐ ओ औ अं अः (like A, E, I, O, and U in English) and 36 consonants in five groups (क वर्ग, च वर्ग, ट वर्ग, त वर्ग and प वर्ग) and 11 individual consonants, are taught to children and illiterate persons through recitation and writing on slates.

Features

Retroflex lateral approximant

Indo-Aryan languages 
Historically, the retroflex lateral approximant (ळ /ɭ/ ) existed in Vedic Sanskrit and was lost in Classical Sanskrit. Today the Indo-Aryan languages in which it exists are Marathi and Konkani (ळ), Oriya (ଳ), Gujarati (ળ), most varieties of Rajasthani, Bhili, some dialects of Punjabi language (ਲ਼), most dialects of Western Pahari, Kumaoni, Haryanavi, and the Saharanpur dialect of Northwestern Kauravi. Of these, Konkani, Rajasthani, Bhili, and Kumaoni, Haryanavi, and the Saharanpur dialect use the Devanagari script. The retroflex lateral approximant does not exist in most other Indo-Aryan Indian languages.

South Indian languages 
The retroflex lateral approximant (ळ /ɭ/ ) exists in many Dravidian languages such as Telugu (ళ), Malayalam (ള), Kannada (ಳ), and Tamil (ள). It was once present in Sinhala (as ළ). It is present in many Indian languages including Vedic Sanskrit.

Eyelash reph / raphar 
The eyelash reph / raphar (रेफ/ रफार) (र्‍) exists in Marathi as well as Nepali. The eyelash reph / raphar (र्‍) is produced in Unicode by the sequence [ra र ] + [virāma ्] + [ZWJ] and [rra ऱ ]+ [virāma ्] + [ZWJ]. In Marathi, when ‘र’ is the first consonant of a consonant cluster and occurs at the beginning of a syllable, it is written as an eyelash reph / raphar.

Minimal pairs

Printing 
Before printing in Marathi was possible, the Modi script was used for writing prose, and balabodha was used for writing poetry. When printing in Marathi became possible, choosing between Modi and balabodha was a problem. William Carey published the first book on Marathi grammar in 1805 using balabodha since printing in the Modi script was not available to him in Serampore, Bengal. At the time, Marathi books were generally written in balabodha. However, subsequent editions of William Carey's book on Marathi grammar, starting in 1810, did employ the Modi script.

As primary style 
On 25 July 1917, the Bombay Presidency decided to replace the Modi script with balabodha as the primary script of administration, for convenience and uniformity with the other areas of the presidency. The Modi script continued to be taught in schools until several decades later and continued to be used as an alternate script to Balabodha. The script was still widely used, until the 1940s, by the people of older generations for personal and financial uses.

However, the use of Modi diminished since then and now Balabodha is the primary script used to write Marathi (other than Modi script revival efforts).

Korku language 

In addition to Marathi, balabodha is also used to write the Korku language of the Munda subdivision Austroasiatic language family, which is spoken by the Korku people who live in parts of Maharashtra and Madhya Pradesh.

See also 
 Modi script, the other Marathi script

References

Brahmic scripts
Marathi language